Clinker Ridge is a mountain ridge in southwestern British Columbia, Canada, located between Garibaldi Lake and the Cheakamus River. Named for Clinker Peak on the western flank of Mount Price, this ridge is one of the two large lava flows from Clinker Peak that ponded against an ice sheet about 9,000 years ago.

See also
Volcanism in Canada

References
BCGNIS Query Results: Clinker Ridge

Ridges of British Columbia
Garibaldi Ranges
Lava flows
Volcanism of British Columbia
New Westminster Land District